Chelycypraea testudinaria, common name the tortoise cowry,  is a species of sea snail, a cowry, a marine gastropod mollusk in the family Cypraeidae, the cowries.

There is one subspecies, Chelycypraea testudinaria ingens Schilder, F.A. & M. Schilder, 1939

Description
They are variable in pattern and color. The shape is oval or sub-cylindrical, the dorsum surface is smooth and shiny, the basic color is whitish or yellowish and it is covered by very irregular dark brown patches and spots. The margins are white or pale brown, with some large dark dots. The base may be whitish, pale brown or pink, the aperture is long and narrow and the teeth are white, short and fine. In the living animal the mantle is bluish-greyish and almost transparent, while the sensorial papillae are lighter and rather long. The mantle and foot are well developed. The lateral flaps of the mantle can completely hide the dorsum surface.

Distribution
This species is distributed in the Indian Ocean and in the Pacific Ocean along Aldabra, Chagos, the Comores, Kenya, Madagascar, the Mascarene Basin, Mauritius, Mozambique, Réunion, the Seychelles, Zanzibar and Tanzania, Malaysia, Samar Island, Sulu Sea, Vietnam and Philippines (excluded Hawaii).

Habitat

References

 Drivas, J. & M. Jay (1988). Coquillages de La Réunion et de l'île Maurice
 Verdcourt, B. (1954). The cowries of the East African Coast (Kenya, Tanganyika, Zanzibar and  Pemba). Journal of the East Africa Natural History Society 22(4) 96: 129–144, 17 pls

External links
 Gastropods
 Underwater
 Clade

Cypraeidae
Gastropods described in 1758
Taxa named by Carl Linnaeus